Dottikon-Dintikon railway station is a railway station in the municipality of Villmergen, in the Swiss canton of Aargau. It is an intermediate stop on the standard gauge Rupperswil–Immensee line of Swiss Federal Railways.

Services
The following services stop at Dottikon-Dintikon:

 Aargau S-Bahn:

References

External links 
 
 

Railway stations in the canton of Aargau
Swiss Federal Railways stations